Starye Maty (İśke Matı) is a rural locality (a selo) and the administrative center of Staromatinsky Selsoviet, Bakalinsky District, Bashkortostan, Russia. The population was 975 as of 2010. There are 16 streets.

Geography 
Starye Maty is located 13 km northeast of Bakaly (the district's administrative centre) by road. Dubrovka is the nearest rural locality.

References 

Rural localities in Bakalinsky District